Adon Olam ("Eternal Lord" or "Sovereign of the Universe") is a hymn in the Jewish liturgy.  It has been a regular part of the daily and Shabbat (Sabbath) liturgy since the 15th century.

Origin
Its authorship and origin are uncertain. It is sometimes attributed to Solomon ibn Gabirol (1021–1058), who is known for his Hebrew poetry, although there is no solid evidence for this, and the regular metric structure does not seem to accord with his other compositions. John Rayner, in his notes to the Siddur Lev Chadash, suggests it was written in the thirteenth or fourteenth century in Spain, noting its absence from the prayer book Sefer Abudarham c. 1340. It has also been attributed to Hai Gaon (939–1038) and even to the Talmudic sage Yohanan ben Zakkai. Although its diction indicates antiquity, it did not become part of the morning liturgy until the 15th century.

Text 
The text of Adon Olam used in Ashkenazic liturgy contains 5 stanzas in 10 lines, as follows:

There are varying texts in the Sephardic version containing added lines (two after line 6, one after line 8, and two after line 10). In some traditions the hymn comprises 6 stanzas, but the fourth stanza (which can be seen as an amplification of the third) is omitted by the Ashkenazim. In others it has 15 lines; in yet others it has 16 lines. It is strictly metrical, written in lines of eight syllables; more precisely, each line is composed of two segments of one yated and 2 tenu'ot, which indeed makes 8 syllables.

Practice

Adon Olam is one of the most familiar hymns in the whole range of the Jewish liturgy and is almost always sung at the end of the Additional Service (Musaf) for Shabbat (Sabbath) and Yom Tov (Festival). In the Roman Machzor it is placed at the end of Sabbath service and sung together with Yigdal.

According to Seligman Baer, the hymn seems to have been intended to be recited before going to sleep, as it closes with the words: "Into His hand I commit my spirit when I fall asleep, and I shall awake." There is a tradition of reciting it each night at bedtime, and also on the deathbed. It may be, however, that the beauty and grandeur of the hymn recommended its use in the liturgy, and that it was chanted indiscriminately at the beginning or the close of the service.

According to the custom of the Sephardim and in British synagogues generally, it is sung by the congregation at the close of Sabbath and festival morning services, and among the Ashkenazi Jews it sometimes takes the place of the hymn Yigdal at the close of the maariv service on these occasions, while both hymns are sometimes chanted on the Eve of Yom Kippur (Kol Nidre). 

In the German rite, it is recited daily at the beginning of morning services. In many other communities, it is often sung to a special tune on the morning of both Rosh Hashana and Yom Kippur by Ashkenazi Jews at the beginning of services.

Because of this solemn association, and on account of its opening and closing sentiments, the hymn has also been selected for (tuneless) reading in the chamber of the dying, and in some congregations it is recited (subdued and tuneless) in the synagogue as a means of reporting a death in the community. It is likewise recited or chanted at the commencement of the daily early morning prayer, that its utterance may help to attune the mind of the worshiper to reverential awe. When it is sung at the end of the service, the congregation sits while singing it, as a demonstration that they are not eager to leave the house of prayer but were willing to stay and continue praying (by starting again at the beginning of the day's prayers).

Tunes
For so widespread and beloved a hymn, the traditional tunes are unusually few. Only four or five of them deserve to be called traditional. Of these the oldest appears to be a short melody of Spanish origin.
The most common tune is attributed to the Russian cantor, Eliezar Mordecai Gerovitsch.

Of similar construction is a melody of northern origin associated by English Jews with the penitential season.

This melody is sometimes sung antiphonally, between Chazan and congregation, like the Spanish tune given above it. The best known of the other traditional antiphonal settings exists in two or three forms, the oldest of which appears to be the one given below (C).

The most common tune is attributed to the Russian cantor, Eliezar Mordecai Gerovitsch. Every one of the synagogal composers of the 19th century has written several settings for "Adon Olam". Most of them—following the earlier practise of the continental synagogues during the modern period (see Choir)—have attempted more or less elaborately polyphonic compositions. But the absurdity of treating an essentially congregational hymn so as to render congregational singing of it impossible is latterly becoming recognized, and many tunes in true hymn form have been more recently composed. Special mention should be made of the setting written by Simon W. Waley (1827–1876) for the West London Synagogue, which has become a classic among the British Jews, having been long ago adopted from the "reform" into the "orthodox" congregations, of England and its colonies.

This song is often sung to many different tunes on account of its meter (Iambic tetrameter). Many synagogues like to use "seasonal" tunes, for instance, Shabbat before Hanukkah, they might do it to Ma'oz Tzur. In Hebrew schools and Jewish summer camps, the Adon Olam hymn is sometimes set, for fun, to secular tunes like "Yankee Doodle" or "Jamaica Farewell". In 1976, Uzi Hitman created a more upbeat tune for the 8th Annual Hasidic Song Festival and has become popular when sung outside traditional liturgical settings.

Translations
Throughout the years there have been several English translations which preserve the original Hebrew meter and rhyming pattern, allowing the hymn to be sung to the same tunes as the original. A rhythmic English version in the book Prayers, Psalms and Hymns for the Use of Jewish Children of 1905 only loosely follows the Hebrew text. 

A rhythmic English version which adheres much more closely to the Hebrew text is attributed to Frederick de Sola Mendes; it appears in the entry Adon Olam in The Jewish Encyclopedia of 1906 and in the Union Hymnal of 1914.

Two 21st-century rhythmic translations appear to take inspiration from the above works: the rhythmic translation in the Koren Sacks Siddur of 2009 quotes heavily from the initial stanzas of the version in Prayers, Psalms and Hymns for the Use of Jewish Children; the unsigned rhythmic translation in the machzor Mishkan HaNefesh of 2015 has a few verses which echo the version of de Sola Mendes.

References

External links 
Adon Olam, with explanations

Hebrew texts 
 kadisha.biz article about the song 
 Lyrics on piyut.org.il

Music 
 Offtonic database of sheet music of Adon Olam and other Jewish liturgical songs, by Mauro Braunstein.

Recordings 
 Text, translation, transliteration, recordings from The Zemirot Database.
 some midis of various versions
 Recordings of Adon Olam spoken in different speeds
 Other
 Adon Olam sung to a melody by Eliezer Gerowitsch (1844–1913) by Brian Shamash
 Adon Olam sung to a Persian melody by Jeanette Rotstain Yahudayan.
 Adon Olam setting by Kenneth Lampl
 Adon Olam Ashkenazi version
 Adon Olam setting by Salamone Rossi (ca. 1570–1630)
 Adon Olom: Past-Present-Future a song about the prayer and its significance by Samuel Schuman, 1944.
 Aaron Minsky plays his published cello variations on Adon Olam
 Traditional Sephardic Singing of Adon Olam
 Standard Book of Jewish Verse (NY 1917, now public domain) several English translations of Adon Olam, pages 390–396.; also, "English Versions of Adon Olam" by Cecil Roth, in his Essay and Portraits in Anglo-Jewish History (1962, Philadelphia, Jewish Publ'n Society) pages 295–302 and originally in the Jewish Monthly, May 1948.
 אדון עולם (Adon Olam), עוזי חיטמן ועודד בן-חור , השיר והמילים
Cantor Azi Schwartz of Park Avenue Synagogue, to the tune of "You'll Be Back" from Hamilton 

187 Adon Olam Videos on YouTube and the Hebrew lyrics with nikud (vowels), an English transliteration of the Hebrew and an English translation.

Jewish liturgical poems
Jewish prayer and ritual texts
Works of unknown authorship
Hebrew words and phrases in Jewish prayers and blessings